Binsoe is a hamlet in the civil parish of West Tanfield, North Yorkshire, England. During the First World War, a field to the east of the hamlet was used as a landing ground for the Royal Flying Corps (later, the Royal Air Force).

History
Binsoe was not recorded in the Domesday Book, but was listed as Binzhou in 1190. The name is believed to have derived from a personal name such as Binteshou. Other variants have been recorded as Bishou in 1202, Bynshu in 1301, and Bynsoo in 1536. The hamlet used to be in the Wapentake of Hallikeld, but was later in the Bedale Rural District. It is now in the Hambleton District of North Yorkshire.

In the Victoria County History book on the North Riding from 1914, a description is made about the road that runs through the hamlet; "where the lane makes a loop round a curious tree-covered mound". This is a round barrow dated from the Late Neolithic period to the Late Bronze Age, and is now a scheduled monument.

Between December 1916 and June 1919, a field to the east of Binsoe was used by No. 76 Squadron in the Home Defence role. After disuse, the field was converted back for agricultural purposes.

Binsoe hamlet is just north of the A6108 road that connects Ripon with Leyburn and Richmond. The road through the hamlet connects with the B6267 road to the north. For census purposes, the hamlet is recorded within the civil parish of West Tanfield.

References

Villages in North Yorkshire
Wensleydale